The Daihatsu Consorte is a small sedan sold by the Japanese automaker Daihatsu from 1969 to 1977. It was based on the Toyota Publica, and its name, meaning "consort" in Italian, reflected Daihatsu's newly established affiliation with Toyota. It replaced the Compagno as Daihatsu's passenger vehicle. The Consorte was derived from Toyota's Publica and was sold at a newly established Japanese dealership network intended to exclusively sell the Publica. This was called Toyota Publica Store until 1966 when it was renamed Toyota Corolla Store to sell the all-new Toyota Corolla. This arrangement allowed Toyota to sell the Publica at recently acquired Daihatsu dealerships, giving Daihatsu a car larger than kei class cars. The Consorte used a Daihatsu developed engine, while the Publica used a two-cylinder, air-cooled, flat-2 U engine.

Initially, the Consorte was available only as a two-door sedan and with Daihatsu's own 1.0-litre FE engine. In June 1971, Publica's 3K 1.2-litre engine was added to the range, both engines only available with 4-speed manual transmission. Facelift model appeared in January 1972. In May 1973, 5-speed manual and 2-speed automatic transmissions added to the line up for 1.2-litre models only, two-door coupe version also added to the lineup. Followed by four-door sedan version in October 1973, but only sold until November 1974, with the launch of the Daihatsu Charmant. The 2-door sedan and coupe were superseded in 1977 (in February for 1.0-litre models and November for 1.2-litre models) by the Daihatsu Charade.

References

Auto Modelle Katalog 1970/71, Vereinigte Motor Verlage Stuttgart (Technical Data for 1970/1971 Daihatsu Consorte 1100 2-door)

Consorte
Subcompact cars
Rear-wheel-drive vehicles
Cars introduced in 1969